The African Cup of Champions Clubs 1975 was the 11th edition of the annual international club football competition held in the CAF region (Africa), the African Cup of Champions Clubs. It determined that year's club champion of association football in Africa.

The tournament was played by 28 teams and used a knock-out format with ties played home and away. Hafia FC from Guinea won the final, and became CAF club champion for the second time.

First round

|}
1 
234

Second round

|}

Quarter-finals

|}

Semi-finals

|}

Final

Champion

Top scorers
The top scorers from the 1975 African Cup of Champions Clubs are as follows:

External links
African Cup of Champions results at Rec.Sport.Soccer Statistics Foundation

1
African Cup of Champions Clubs